Lisa Carlsen (born 17 February 1965) is a Canadian equestrian. She competed in two events at the 1988 Summer Olympics.

References

External links
 

1965 births
Living people
Canadian female equestrians
Olympic equestrians of Canada
Equestrians at the 1988 Summer Olympics
Equestrians at the 1987 Pan American Games
Equestrians at the 2019 Pan American Games
Pan American Games medalists in equestrian
Pan American Games gold medalists for Canada
Sportspeople from Toronto
Medalists at the 1987 Pan American Games
20th-century Canadian women
21st-century Canadian women